Butcher Creek is a stream in southern Lincoln County in the U.S. state of Missouri. It is a tributary to Crooked Creek.

The stream flows to the east-northeast passing under U.S. Route 61 approximately 1.5 miles south of Moscow Mills. The stream continues to the northeast to its confluence with Crooked Creek about one half mile upstream of Crooked Creek's confluence with the Cuivre River.

Butcher Creek is a corruption of Buecher, the German surname of a pioneer citizen.

See also
List of rivers of Missouri

References

Rivers of Lincoln County, Missouri
Rivers of Missouri